Kmart is a major chain of retail stores in the United States.

Kmart may also refer to:

Brands and enterprises
Kmart Australia - a chain of retail stores in Australia no longer connected with the American chain

People
Kmart is the nickname of:
Kelvin Martin (American football), an NFL player
Kenyon Martin, an NBA player
Kevin Martin (basketball, born 1983), an NBA player
Kevin Martin (curler), a curler
Carlos Martínez (pitcher, born 1982), an MLB pitcher

Other uses
K-Mart, a character in the Resident Evil franchise